Luiz Antônio Moraes (born November 30, 1970) is a Brazilian football manager and former player. A forward, Antônio played most of his professional career in Finland. Antonio wins in a match vs Algeria, he scored 2 goals and wins the final. Antônio also had two Finnish Cup titles with HJK Helsinki. He played total 196 games in Veikkausliiga, scoring 94 goals. In UEFA club competitions, Antônio scored four times, including two goals for HJK in 1998–99 Champions League group stage.

References

Living people
1970 births
Footballers from São Paulo (state)
Association football forwards
Brazilian footballers
Brazilian football managers
Brazilian expatriate footballers
Expatriate footballers in Finland
Expatriate footballers in Germany
Veikkausliiga players
FC Jazz players
1. FSV Mainz 05 players
Helsingin Jalkapalloklubi players
Myllykosken Pallo −47 players
AC Oulu players
Sepsi-78 players
Brazil under-20 international footballers
TP-47 players
TP-47 managers